Sheriff House is a Grade II* listed building on St James’ Street Nottingham.

History
The house was built for Cornelius Launder. The date of construction was recorded on a date-stone inscribed 'C1767L' but this is no longer extant. Cornelius Launder, Sheriff of Nottingham in 1775, was a notable landlord and had a reputation as a miser, but spared no expense on his own house and lived here until his death in 1806. The building shows similarities to 41 Friar Gate in Derby which dates from 1771 so there is a suggestion that the architect of Sheriff House was Joseph Pickford of Derby. The building had no rear garden, but possessed a garden on the opposite side of the street.

The building was sold after 1908 and became the headquarters of the Medico-Chirurgical Society who were resident until 1956. It was put up for sale in 1990. It was restored by Nicholas Forman Hardy with Gervase Jackson-Stops in 1995.

References

Grade II* listed buildings in Nottinghamshire
Buildings and structures in Nottingham
Buildings and structures completed in 1767